Bankra Nayabaz railway station is a railway station on Santragachi–Amta branch line of South Eastern Railway section of the Kharagpur railway division. It is situated beside Unsani-Nayabaz Road at Bankranayabaz, Bankra in Howrah district in the Indian state of West Bengal.

History 
Howrah to Amta narrow-gauge track was built in 1897 in British India. This route was the part of the Martin's Light Railways which was closed in 1971. Howrah–Amta new broad-gauge line, including the Bargachia–Champadanga branch line was re constructed and opened in 2002–2004.

References 

Railway stations in Howrah district
Kharagpur railway division
Kolkata Suburban Railway stations